Drew Anderson may refer to:

 Drew Anderson (American football) (born 1995), American football player
 Drew Anderson (outfielder) (born 1981), American baseball outfielder
 Drew Anderson (pitcher) (born 1994), American baseball pitcher